Hurd is a surname. Notable people with the surname include:

 Andrew Hurd (born 1982), Canadian Olympic swimmer
 Anthony Hurd, Baron Hurd (1901–1966), former British politician in the Conservative Party
 Clement Hurd (1908–1988), American illustrator of children's books
 David Hurd (born 1950), American composer, concert organist
 Douglas Hurd (born 1930), British politician in the Conservative Party
 Elizabeth Shakman Hurd, American academic
 Ethel Edgerton Hurd (1845–1929), American physician, suffragist, and social reformer
 Gale Anne Hurd (born 1955), American film producer
 Helen Marr Hurd (1839–1909), American educator, poet
 Hugh Lincoln Hurd (1925–1995), an American actor and civil rights activist, and Michelle Hurd's father
 Jalen Hurd (born 1996), American football player
 Jud Hurd (1913–2005), American cartoonist
 Karen Hurd (born 1958), Wisconsin politician
 Mark Hurd (1957-2019), American CEO of Oracle Corp.
 Michelle Hurd (born 1966), American stage, film, and television actress, and Hugh Hurd's daughter
 Morgan Hurd (born 2001), American artistic gymnast
 Nick Hurd (born 1962), British politician in the Conservative Party
 Paige Hurd (born 1992), American actress
 Percy Hurd (1864–1950), former British politician in the Conservative Party
 Peter Hurd (1904–1984), American artist
 Rachel Hurd-Wood (born 1990), British actress
 Richard Hurd (bishop) (1720–1808), English clergyman and writer
 Richard Hurd (educator), American labor scholar
 Richard Melancthon Hurd (1865–1941), American real estate banker and political activist
 Robert Hurd (1905–1963), British architect
 Thacher Hurd (born 1949), American artist and author of children's picture books
 Thaddeus B. Hurd (1903–1989), American architect and amateur historian known for his research on Clyde, Ohio
 Theodore A. Hurd (1819–1899), Justice of the Kansas Supreme Court
 Thomas Hurd (1747–1823), British naval officer and hydrographer
 Will Hurd (born 1977), American politician and member of the U.S. House of Representatives from Texas
 Annie May Hurd Karrer (1893–1984), American plant physiologist

See also
Herd (surname)